The 2014 Arctic Winter Games, officially known with the slogan "Great Spirit - Northern Dreams", was a winter multi-sport event which took place in Fairbanks, Alaska, United States, between  15–22 March 2014. Some events took place in North Pole.

The Arctic Winter Games is the world's largest multisport and cultural event for young people of the Arctic. The Games is an international biennial celebration of circumpolar sports and culture held for a week, each time with a different nation or region as the host. AWG celebrates sports, social interaction and culture. The Games contributes to creating an awareness on cultural diversity, and develops athletes to participate in the competitions with the focus on fair play. The Games binds the Arctic countries together and includes traditional games such as Arctic sports and Dené games.

Around 1,400 athletes from nine teams participated in the games.

Organization
The 2014 Arctic Winter Games were set in Fairbanks, Alaska. Jeff Jacobson was the president of the host society and Perry Ahsogeak the vice president. Karen Lane was the general manager.

Participants
Nine contingents participated in the 2014 Arctic Winter Games. The amount of athletes sent by each contingent is shown in parenthesis in the list below.
 Alaska, United States (286) (host)
 Greenland (108) 
 Northern Alberta, Canada (188)
 Northwest Territories, Canada (274) 
 Nunavik, Quebec, Canada (62)
 Nunavut, Canada (214)
 Sámi people (33)
 Yamalo-Nenets, Russia (70)
 Yukon, Canada (237)

Venues
The 2014 games were held at various sports venues and schools in Fairbanks. Opening and closing ceremonies were held at Carlson Center.

Sports Venues

The following venues hosted sports events during the games. All locations were located in or around Fairbanks unless mentioned otherwise.

Cultural and Other Venues

The following venues hosted cultural and other events during the games. All locations were located in or around Fairbanks unless mentioned otherwise.

Medal tally

The Games

Sports
265 events in 20 sport disciplines were scheduled in the 2014 Arctic Winter Games program. Four skiing sports were held, with alpine skiing, biathlon, cross-country skiing, and snowboarding. Two snowshoe events were held, with snowshoe biathlon and snowshoeing. Two racquet sports were held, with badminton and table tennis. Two skating events were held, those being figure skating and short track speed skating. Team sports held were basketball, indoor soccer, ice hockey, volleyball, and curling. Traditional Inuit sports were also held, with Arctic sports, Dene games, dog mushing, and wrestling, the latter also including events for traditional wrestling. Also held was gymnastics.

Calendar

Culture
Each edition of the Arctic Winter Games showcases a series of different cultures from around the Arctic. Especially indigenous culture is on display, with cultural exhibitions and activities. Many other cultural events are also held throughout the games.

Hodgson Trophy
At each Arctic Winter Games, the AWG International Committee presents the Hodgson Trophy to the contingent whose athletes best exemplify the ideals of fair play and team spirit. Team members also receive a distinctive pin in recognition of their accomplishment. The Greenlandic team and delegation won the Hodgson Trophy at the 2014 Arctic Winter Games.

References

External links
 2014 Arctic Winter Games Official Site
 Arctic Winter Games Official Site

 
 

Arctic Winter Games
Arctic Winter Games
Arctic Winter Games
Arctic Winter Games
Arctic Winter Games
Winter multi-sport events in the United States
Sports competitions in Alaska
Sports in Fairbanks, Alaska